The United States Third Fleet is one of the numbered fleets in the United States Navy. Third Fleet's area of responsibility includes approximately fifty million square miles of the eastern and northern Pacific Ocean areas including the Bering Sea, Alaska, the Aleutian Islands, and a sector of the Arctic. Major oil and trade sea lines of communication within this area are critically important to the economic health of the United States and friendly nations throughout the Pacific Rim region.

First established in 1943, the Third Fleet conducted extensive operations against Japanese forces in the Central Pacific during World War II. Deactivated in 1945, the fleet remained inactive until 1973, when it was reactivated and assumed its current responsibilities.

Mission 
The Third Fleet plans and executes naval operations in the Pacific Ocean. The fleet provides maritime homeland defense, regional security, and humanitarian operations support through integrated naval and coastguard forces acting as a single Sea Service. It strengthens relations between the U.S. and its allies and partners through joint, inter-agency and multinational exercises and operations like Rim of the Pacific, Pacific Partnership, and Fleet Weeks. The Third Fleet ensures realistic, relevant training to its personnel so they have the necessary skills to promote peace and prevail in conflict.

The Third Fleet is a combat-ready power in control of ships, submarines, and aircraft stationed in California, Washington, and Hawaii. The Third Fleet's sea-going force includes five aircraft carrier strike groups, each consisting of a combination of cruisers, destroyers, and frigates. They also have more than 30 submarines and a dozen supply ships to support the strike groups. Third Fleet's air forces comprises more than 400 Navy aircraft, including Boeing F/A-18 Super Hornets, Northrop Grumman E-2C Hawkeyes, McDonnell Douglas AV-8B Harrier II, Bell AH-1Z SuperCobra and Sikorsky SH-60 Seahawk helicopters.

History

World War II 
The Third Fleet was originally formed during World War II on 15 March 1943 under the command of Admiral William F. Halsey. Its on-shore headquarters in Pearl Harbor, Hawaii was established on 15 June 1944. The ships of the Third Fleet also formed the basis of the Fifth Fleet, formed on 26 April 1944, which was the designation of the "Big Blue Fleet" when under the command of Admiral Raymond A. Spruance. Spruance and Halsey alternated command of the fleet for major operations, allowing the other admiral and his staff time to plan for subsequent operations.  A secondary benefit was confusing the Japanese into thinking that there were actually two separate fleets as the fleet designation flipped back and forth.

While under Halsey's command as the Third Fleet, the fleet operated in and around the Solomon Islands, the Philippines, Formosa, Okinawa, the Ryukyu Islands, and the Japanese Home Islands, first with the battleship  and, from May 1945 to the end of the war, the battleship  as its flagship. As the Third Fleet, it took part in the Palau Islands campaign of September–November 1944 and the Philippines campaign of 1944–1945, defeated the Imperial Japanese Navy in two of the four major actions – the Battle of the Sibuyan Sea and the Battle off Cape Engaño – that made up the Battle of Leyte Gulf in October 1944, encountered the damaging Typhoon Cobra in December 1944, endured Typhoon Connie in June 1945, and took part in the war's final operations in Japanese waters in the summer of 1945, launching air attacks on Tokyo, the naval base at Kure, and the island of Hokkaidō and bombarding several Japanese coastal cities with naval gunfire.

The British Pacific Fleet was operating as Task Force 57 of the Fifth Fleet when Halsey relieved Spruance of command in May 1945. Like the rest of the Fifth Fleet's ships, the British ships were resubordinated from Spruance's Fifth Fleet to Halsey's Third Fleet. The British Pacific Fleet then constituted Task Force 37 under the Third Fleet's operational command through the end of World War II on 15 August 1945.

The Third Fleet's next major combat operation would have been Operation Olympic, the invasion of Kyushu in the Japanese Home Islands, scheduled to begin on 1 November 1945, during which it would have operated simultaneously with the Fifth Fleet for the first time. The end of the war made this operation unnecessary.

Embarked aboard Missouri, Admiral Halsey led the Third Fleet into Tokyo Bay on 29 August 1945. On 2 September 1945, the documents of surrender of the Japanese Empire ending the war were signed on Missouris deck. The Third Fleet remained in Japanese waters until late September 1945, when its ships were directed to proceed to the United States West Coast. On 7 October 1945, the Third Fleet was designated a reserve fleet and decommissioned from active status.

Re-establishment and after 

On 1 February 1973, following a reorganization of the Pacific Fleet, the Third Fleet was recommissioned as an active fleet and assumed the duties of the former First Fleet and Pacific Anti-Submarine Warfare Force located at Ford Island, Hawaii. Third Fleet's new duties were to train naval forces for overseas deployment and evaluate state-of-the-art technology for fleet use. Additionally, Third Fleet could deploy in the event of a major conflict.

On 26 November 1986, Commander, Third Fleet shifted his flag from his headquarters ashore to resume status as an afloat commander for the first time since World War II, aboard . In August 1991, Third Fleet's commander, his staff and the command ship Coronado shifted homeports to San Diego. In September 2003, Commander, Third Fleet shifted his flag from the command ship Coronado to headquarters ashore at Point Loma, San Diego, California.

USS Ronald Reagan and other Third Fleet ships participated in the International Fleet Review (IFR) commemorating the 100th birthday of the Royal Canadian Navy in Victoria, British Columbia. Joining Ronald Reagan for the naval review were the cruiser , the destroyer , and the frigate . The naval review took place 9–12 June 2010, and it involved 21 naval ships and more than 8,000 naval personnel from Canada, the French Navy, the Japanese Maritime Self-Defense Force, the Royal Australian Navy, the Royal New Zealand Navy, and the United States.

In 2015, Nora Tyson was installed as the new commander of the Third Fleet, making her the first woman to lead a numbered fleet in the U.S. Navy.

Current operations 
Third Fleet's primary mission is one of conflict deterrence, but in the event of general war, it would conduct prompt and sustained combat operations at sea. Such operations would be executed well forward and early in a conflict to carry out the primary wartime mission of Third Fleet—the defense of the western sea approaches to the United States, including Alaska and the Aleutian Islands.

In peacetime, Third Fleet continually trains Navy and U.S. Marine Corps forces for their expeditionary warfare mission. Third Fleet training has been designed to ensure that deploying forces are fully prepared for joint operations. All training is conducted within a joint environment—employing joint doctrine, terminology, procedures, command and control—to ensure that forces are ready to join with the other United States armed forces branches under a joint command structure.

Commander, Third Fleet is also designated as a Joint Task Force (JTF) commander. In that capacity, the commander and their staff may be assigned responsibilities for command of joint U.S. forces deployed in response to a specific event or contingency. As such, the JTF commander reports via a joint chain of command to a unified commander. Commander, U.S. Pacific Command is the unified commander in the Pacific theater.

To allow 7th Fleet to focus more resources on a potential North Korean contingency, the 3rd Fleet is building up its ability to operate forces beyond the International Date Line, in areas of the Western Pacific hitherto commanded by 7th Fleet. The "3rd Fleet Forward" concept was announced by U.S. Pacific Fleet commander Admiral Scott Swift in 2015, but 3rd Fleet commander Vice Adm. Nora Tyson said at the "WEST 2017" conference that the North Korean threat was a main driver behind this effort:

"What we have done in the past really 18 months is we, 3rd Fleet, have worked very closely with 7th Fleet and PACFLT in developing our, 3rd fleet's, capability to command and control forces forward in the Western Pacific, with the assumption that if something were to happen – and as [Vice Admiral Joseph Aucoin, Commander 7th Fleet] said, the number-one probability fight-tonight scenario would be on the Korean Peninsula. 
"If that were the case, the assumption is that [Aucoin] and his team would be pretty busy up there.. working for General Brooks [ComUSFK/CFC/UNC] and 3rd Fleet would be available to provide that command element to handle whatever else may happen in the Pacific Fleet AOR ...be it a major humanitarian disaster requiring that level of [joint task force] three-star commander, be it some scenario, maritime security issue in the South China Sea. So we have been working very closely with 7th Fleet, [Aucoin] and his team, and PACFLT to ensure that we have the connective tissue where if something were to happen that 3rd Fleet could very quickly respond, complement [Aucoin] and his team and handle whatever scenario may come to pass in the Pacific theater."

In April 2016, Vice Admiral Tyson deployed a three-ship Surface Action Group of warships (Momsen, Spruance, and )) to the Western Pacific. On Oct. 21, one of them, the destroyer USS Decatur conducted a "Freedom of Navigation" passage near the Paracel Islands, separately claimed by the PRC, Vietnam and Taiwan. All three ships remained under Third Fleet command during the entire operation. As Tyson partially acknowledged during her WEST 2017 conference remarks, "the Chinese know that this administrative (and) operational innovation is directed at them," said Toshi Yoshihara, a U.S. Naval War College professor in January 2017.

Component units 
U.S. Third Fleet component units include the following:
 Carrier Strike Group One
 Carrier Strike Group Three
 Carrier Strike Group Nine
 Carrier Strike Group Eleven
 Expeditionary Strike Group Three
 Naval Surface Group Mid-Pacific
 Littoral Combat Ship Squadron One
 Helicopter Maritime Strike Wing
 Commander, Strike Force Training Pacific
 Explosive Ordnance Disposal Group One
 Coastal Riverine Group One
 Navy Air and Missile Defense Command
 Naval Mine and Anti-Submarine Warfare Command
 Submarine and Theater Anti-Submarine Warfare Force Third Fleet

Task Forces

List of commanders

Notes

Citations

Bibliography

External links 
 Commander, United States Navy Third Fleet homepage

03
03
Military units and formations established in 1943